The 2007 Sydney Roosters season was the 100th in the club's history. They competed in the NRL's 2007 Telstra Premiership and finished 10th (out of 16).

Season summary

The Sydney Roosters had a relatively poor start to their 100th season, not recording a win until Round 7 against the St George-Illawarra Dragons on Anzac Day. This however was juxtaposed by a rather strong period in the middle of the year winning 5 of their last 8 matches between Rounds 7 and 14.

Despite their poor start to the season, the Sydney Roosters were having a late season resurgence under newly appointed Care-Taker Coach Brad Fittler. Since Chris Anderson left the club following their 56–0 loss to Manly Sea Eagles, the Sydney Roosters were yet to lose a game in 5 consecutive matches and were a few days ago, in 10th position. That came from wins over the likes of the Cronulla Sharks, Newcastle Knights, Melbourne Storm and Wests Tigers with a draw to the New Zealand Warriors. Then on 19 August, the run of being undefeated by Brad Fittler was broken, as the Gold Coast Titans claimed victory 22–18. This sits the Sydney Roosters on 11th, still a mathematical chance of making the finals.

Ladder

Results

Notable events
 Sydney Roosters celebrate their 100th year in the competition
 In round 7 the Roosters defeated the St George Illawarra Dragons 18–4. This victory marked the 1,000th win in the club's history. The Roosters were the first club to achieve this feat.
 The Roosters scored an unprecedented 64 points in round 13 against the Cowboys. This was the third highest number of points scored in a single game by the Roosters.
 In the Roosters round 14 victory over the Penrith Panthers, the Sydney Roosters recorded their first back to back win since 2005.
 The Roosters 56-point thrashing by Manly was their second worst defeat by Manly, and the Roosters seventh worst loss of all time. Following this loss, Chris Anderson resigned as coach with club legend Brad Fittler named as coach for the rest of the season.
 On 14 July the Sydney Roosters defeated the Cronulla Sharks 23–12. This result after a restless week at the Roosters marked Brad Fittler's first win as a first grade coach.
 With the round 20 victory over the competition leaders and premiership favourites, the Melbourne Storm (26–16), the Sydney Roosters recorded their first three consecutive wins since the finals series in 2004, a run which was halted by the Grand Final loss to the Canterbury Bulldogs.
 In round 22, the Roosters became the first team in NRL history to go to Golden Point extra-time for two consecutive matches. They went on to win the match with a Joel Monaghan try.
 In round 23, Brad Fittler tasted defeat for the first time in his coaching career, a loss to the Gold Coast Titans, 22–18.
 On 28 August 2007, care-taker Head Coach Brad Fittler AM was appointed as the Head Coach for season 2008 (101st season for the Sydney Roosters).

Wins

 Round 07, Sydney Roosters 18 defeated St George Illawarra Dragons 4 at Aussie Stadium
 Round 09, Sydney Roosters 24 defeated Gold Coast Titans 18 at Aussie Stadium
 Round 11, Sydney Roosters 13 defeated Cronulla Sharks 12 at Toyota Park
 Round 13, Sydney Roosters 64 defeated North Queensland Cowboys 30 at Aussie Stadium
 Round 14, Sydney Roosters 24 defeated Penrith Panthers 20 at CUA Stadium
 Round 18, Sydney Roosters 23 defeated Cronulla Sharks 12 at Aussie Stadium
 Round 19, Sydney Roosters 20 defeated Newcastle Knights 17 at Energy Australia Stadium
 Round 20, Sydney Roosters 26 defeated Melbourne Storm 16 at Aussie Stadium
 Round 22, Sydney Roosters 26 defeated Wests Tigers 22 at Telstra Stadium

Draws
Round 21, Sydney Roosters 31 drew with the New Zealand Warriors at the Sydney Football Stadium

Players

The following is the Sydney Roosters squad named for the 2007 season. For Player Contracts see below in the external links section for details.

#

 Jamie Soward as of 28 May has left the Sydney Roosters. He is now a member of the St George Illawarra Dragons.
 Josh Lewis as of 14 May gained a release from the Sydney Roosters and with immediate effect will play for the Gold Coast Titans
 Nigel Plum as of 5 June sought and was granted a release from the Sydney Roosters and has immediately signed with the Canberra Raiders.
 Chris Flannery as of 15 June has been granted a release from the Sydney Roosters. Flannery, a seasoned origin player for Queensland has since signed with St. Helens in the Super League.

Player Summary

Player Movements

Incoming

Outgoing

Representative Players
The following is a list of Sydney Rooster players who have played for Australia or New Zealand and other nations, New South Wales or Queensland and City or Country in representative levels of football during the 2007 calendar year. This is correct as of 15 May 2007

International

Australia
 Anthony Tupou

New Zealand
 Iosia Soliola

State of Origin

New South Wales
 Anthony Minichiello
 Braith Anasta
 Anthony Tupou

Queensland
 Nate Myles

City Vs Country

City
 Anthony Minichiello
 Braith Anasta
 Craig Wing

Country
 Amos Roberts
 Craig Fitzgibbon

Staff

Coaching Staff

Head coach – Brad Fittler AM (10 July 2007 – )
Head coach – Chris Anderson (16 March 2007 – 9 July 2007)
Physical Performance Manager  – Ronald Palmer
Strength and Conditioning coach – Richard Harris
Strength and Conditioning coach – Ben Gardiner
Jersey Flegg and NRL Assistant coach – James Pickering
Club Physotherapist – Tony Ayoub
Football Manager – Troy Rovelli
Team doctor – Dr John Orchid
Recruitment and Retention – Arthur Beetson OAM

Assistant Staff/ Consultants
Luke Phillips
Luke Ricketson
Adrian Lam
Phil Gould

Executive

CEO – Brian Canavan
Chairman – Nick Politis

List incomplete

References

External links
 Official Sydney Roosters Website
 Official Sydney Roosters Player Contracts
 Official Australian Rugby League Website
 Official National Rugby League Website
 Official New South Wales Rugby League Website
 Official Queensland Rugby League Website
 Official Country Rugby League of New South Wales Website
 Official New Zealand Rugby League Website
 Official International Rugby League Website

Sydney Roosters seasons
Sydney Roosters season